Zamzam–Sheriff–Phillips syndrome is a rare autosomal recessive congenital disorder. It is characterized by aniridia, ectopia lentis, abnormal upper incisors and intellectual disability. Not a lot of research has been undertaken of this particular disease so thus far there is no known gene that affects this condition. However it has been hypothesised that the symptoms described are found at a particular gene, though intellectual disability is believed to be due to a different genetic cause.

Consanguinuity (intermarrying among relatives such as cousins), often associated with autosomal recessive inheritance, has been attributed to the inheritance of this disease.

References

Autosomal recessive disorders
Rare diseases
Congenital disorders
Syndromes
Genetic disorders with no OMIM